The muffuletta or muffaletta is both a type of round Sicilian sesame bread and a popular sandwich that originated among Italian immigrants in New Orleans, Louisiana, using the same bread.

History
The muffuletta bread has origins in Sicily.

The muffuletta sandwich is said to have been created in 1906 at Central Grocery Co. on Decatur Street, New Orleans, Louisiana, U.S., by its delicatessen owner Salvatore Lupo, a Sicilian immigrant. Sicilian immigrant Biaggio Montalbano (Wikidata), who was a delicatessen owner in New Orleans, is credited with invention of the Roma Sandwich, which may have been a forerunner of the Muffuletta. Another Italian-style New Orleans delicatessen, Progress Grocery Co., originally opened in 1924 by the Perrone family, claims the origin of the muffuletta is uncertain.

The traditional-style muffuletta sandwich consists of a muffuletta loaf split horizontally and covered with layers of marinated muffuletta-style olive salad, salami, ham, Swiss cheese, provolone, and mortadella. Quarter, half, and full-sized muffulettas are sold.

The signature olive salad consists of olives diced with the celery, cauliflower and carrot found in a jar of giardiniera, seasoned with oregano and garlic, covered in olive oil, and allowed to combine for at least 24 hours.

A muffuletta is usually served cold, but many vendors will toast it.

Etymology, pronunciation, and orthography

The name is believed to be a diminutive form of muffe ("mold", "mushroom"), perhaps due to the round sandwich bread being reminiscent of a mushroom cap; or from muffola, "muff, mitten,". The forms muffoletta and its iterations are modern Italianisms of the original Sicilian. Like many of the foreign-influenced terms found in New Orleans, pronunciation has evolved from a phonetic forebear.

Depending on the specific Sicilian dialect, the item may be spelled:

muffiletta
mufiletta
muffuletta
muffulettu
muffuletu
muffulitteḍḍu
muffulittuni
mufuletta

There are similarities between the muffuletta and the pan bagnat sandwich which comes from Nice, France.

See also
 List of American sandwiches
 List of sandwiches
 Pan bagnat

References

External links
 
 Central Grocery Co. — Home of the American-style muffuletta sandwich.
 

Louisiana cuisine
American sandwiches
Italian-American culture in Louisiana
Cuisine of New Orleans
Sicilian-American cuisine
Italian breads
American breads
Olive dishes